Pourandokht "Pouran" Bazargan was an Iranian teacher, revolutionary and translator. She was notably the first female member of the People's Mojahedin Organization of Iran (MEK).

Biography 

Bazargan was born in a middle-class family in the city of Mashhad and was brought up as a devout Muslim. As an adult she became principal of Refah School, a girls school in Tehran. Bazargan joined the MEK as the first woman ever, and married Mohammad Hanifnejad, a co-founder of the group. Bazargan was a regular of Ali Shariati speeches at Hosseiniyeh Ershad and personally in touch with him. According to Ali Rahnema, Shariaiti who knew that Bazargan was associated with the MEK, introduced Simin Jariri to her. Bazargan left Iran after the blow to the MEK and resided in a number of countries, including Syria, Lebanon and Turkey, to act as a liaison for the group. In 1974, she married fellow MEK member Torab Haghshenas. In 1975, she sided with the Marxist faction of the MEK. Among her family members in the MEK, only her sister converted to Marxism while her brother Mansour Bazargan and sister-in-law Fatemeh Amini remained Muslims and associates of the Islamic faction. 

After the Iranian Revolution, Bazargan became a member of the communist Organization of Struggle for the Emancipation of the Working Class and continued her political activity in exile. Despite her status as the widow of the MEK's martyr and co-founder, as well as being the first woman in the group, she became a critic of the MEK. In 1985, Bazargan openly opposed marriage of MEK leader Massoud Rajavi and Maryam Qajar-Azodanlu, describing it as "an insult" to the memory of the early MEK leaders and comparing Rajavi with the Shah. She also denounced subsequent events in the group as part of its "ideological revolution", stating that "the divorce, the abandonment of children, and the marriage to the wife of a close friend was unprecedented in political movements".

In exile, Bazargan translated many works from French, English and Arabic with her husband Torab Haghshenas and launched a website name Peykar Andisheh. The couple espoused a more internationalist view and became critical of armed struggle because they believed guerrilla movements were isolated from the workers' movement. 

Bazargan died in 2007.

References 

 
 
 

1937 births
People from Mashhad
2007 deaths
People's Mojahedin Organization of Iran members
Iranian educators
Iranian translators
Iranian Marxists
Iranian expatriates in Syria
Iranian expatriates in Lebanon
Iranian expatriates in Turkey
Iranian expatriates in France
Iranian schoolteachers